Holborne is a surname. Notable people with the surname include:

Anthony Holborne (1545–1602), composer of English consort music during the reign of Queen Elizabeth I
James Holborne of Menstrie, Scottish soldier during the years of the English Civil War
Robert Holborne (died 1647), lawyer, Member of Parliament, attorney-general to Prince of Wales, knighted 1643
William Holborne, officer on the flagship of Admiral Sir Edward Hawke, the Kent, in 1747

de:Holborne